David de Miguel-Lapiedra (born 7 February 1965) is a former professional tennis player from Spain.

Career
De Miguel had a good year as a junior in 1983, when he was an Orange Bowl semifinalist and won the Spanish Championships.

The Spaniard made his first Grand Prix quarterfinal in 1984, at Florence. He also reached the quarterfinals in Madrid the following year.

In 1986 he took part in both the French Open and Wimbledon Championships but lost in the first round at each, to Henri Leconte and then John Sadri. He made his only Grand Slam mixed doubles appearance in that French Open tournament, with Manuela Maleeva. They reached the round of 16. Also that year, he made quarter-finals in Stuttgart, where he had a win over world no.  24 Slobodan Živojinović, and in Barcelona. His best results however came in the doubles. He and Jordi Arrese were doubles champions in the 1986 Bordeaux Open, having months earlier finished runner-up with Jesus Colas in Madrid.

At the 1987 French Open, de Miguel progressed past the opening round of the men's doubles for the only time, partnering Arrese. He lost in the first round of the 1987 Wimbledon Championships to Scott Davis.

Grand Prix career finals

Doubles: 2 (1–1)

Challenger titles

Singles: (1)

Doubles: (1)

References

1965 births
Living people
Spanish male tennis players
People from Tortosa
Sportspeople from the Province of Tarragona
Tennis players from Catalonia